Stern is the name of two different but related arcade gaming companies. Stern Electronics, Inc. manufactured arcade video games and pinball machines from 1977 until 1985, and was best known for Berzerk. Stern Pinball, Inc., founded in 1999, is a manufacturer of pinball machines in North America.

Stern Electronics, Inc.

Stern Electronics was formed when the Stern family bought the financially troubled Chicago Coin in 1977. Chicago Coin's assets were purchased at bankruptcy sales forming the core inventory of Stern Electronics, Inc.; however, as a separate company, they did not assume any of the debt Chicago Coin had amassed.

The first two games made by Stern were Stampede and Rawhide, both originally made by Chicago Coin, which only had changes made to their branding and logos. After a weak start, Stern Electronics' sales started picking up by the end of 1977. By 1978, they had switched over to fully solid-state electronics for their games. In 1979, Stern acquired the jukebox production assets of the bankrupt Seeburg Corporation, and the company became known as Stern / Seeburg. Coincidentally, Seeburg also owned Williams in the 1960s, when Sam Stern was its president.

When arcade video games became popular in 1980, Stern Electronics produced Berzerk. In 1983, Stern became one of many victims of the amusement industry economic shakeout that occurred. In 1985, Stern Electronics left the amusement industry. Personnel from Stern Electronics formed a short-lived venture known as Pinstar, producing conversion kits for old Bally and Stern machines. Gary Stern was the president of Stern Electronics, Inc, Pinstar Inc, and Data East pinball.

Stern Pinball, Inc.
By 1999, the pinball industry was virtually dead and Williams stopped manufacturing pinball machines and focused on gambling devices as WMS Gaming. During the same year, Sega left the pinball industry and sold its pinball division, previously purchased from Data East in 1994, to Gary Stern, the son of Sam Stern. In October 1999, Sega sold the pinball portion of its company to Gary Stern, who had been running Data East/Sega pinball since 1986, and Stern Pinball was born. Stern Pinball, Inc. is based in Elk Grove Village, Illinois.

As of 2021, longtime designers Brian Eddy, John Borg, and George Gomez are designing pinball games at Stern Pinball, alongside former professional player Keith Elwin.

Some Stern pinball tables were also digitally released through The Pinball Arcade and Stern Pinball Arcade.

Pinball machines

Stern Electronics

 Stampede (1977)
 Rawhide (1977)
 Disco (1977)
 Pinball (1977)
 Stingray (1977)
 Stars (1978)
 Memory Lane (1978)
 Lectronamo (1978)
 Wild Fyre (1978)
 Nugent (1978)
 Dracula (1979)
 Trident (1979)
 Hot Hand (1979)
 Magic (1979)
 Cosmic Princess (1979) (Produced in Australia by Leisure and Allied Industries under license from Stern Electronics Inc)
 Meteor (1979) (Highest production of all Stern Electronics' Pinballs)
 Galaxy (1980)
 Ali (1980)
 Big Game (1980) (First game to incorporate seven-digit scoring in the digital era)
 Seawitch (1980)
 Cheetah (1980)
 Quicksilver (1980)
 Star Gazer (1980)
 Flight 2000 (1980) (Stern's first game with multi-ball and speech)
 Nine Ball (1980)
 Freefall (1981)
 Lightning (1981)
 Split Second (1981)
 Catacomb (1981)
 Viper (1981)
 Dragonfist (1982)
 Iron Maiden (1982) (Unrelated to the British heavy metal band)
 Orbitor 1 (1982) (Featured a 3d-vacuum formed playfield with spinning rubber bumpers causing frenetic ball action; it was the company's last released game)
 Cue (1982) (Six machines built)
 Cliff Hanger (1983, not a pinball machine, arcade machine based on the manga 'Lupin the Third' by the artist 'Monkey Punch')
 Lazer Lord (1984) (One prototype built)

Stern Pinball

 South Park (2000) Last limited run after taking over from SEGA. Initially 2,200 (SEGA) and either 242 or 600 on the second run (STERN).
 Harley Davidson (1999; 2nd revision 2002; 3rd edition 2004 slightly updated of the Sega game)
 Striker Xtreme (2000)
 Sharkey's Shootout (2000)
 High Roller Casino (2001)
 Austin Powers (2001, designed by John Borg and based on the Austin Powers film series)
 Monopoly (2001)
 NFL (2001) (basically a modification of Striker Xtreme)
 Playboy (2002) (Design by George Gomez and Dwight Sullivan)
 RollerCoaster Tycoon (2002) (produced by Pat Lawlor Designs)
 The Simpsons Pinball Party (2003)
 Terminator 3: Rise of the Machines (2003) produced by Steve Ritchie Productions [SRP])
 The Lord of the Rings (2003) (Design by George Gomez)
 Ripley's Believe It or Not! (2004, produced by PLD, based on the series Ripley's Believe It or Not!)
 Elvis (2004) produced by Steve Ritchie Productions (SRP), also 500 Gold/LE models exist 
 The Sopranos (2005, based on the series The Sopranos)(Design by George Gomez)
 NASCAR (Grand Prix in Europe) (2005; produced by PLD)
 World Poker Tour (2006) produced by SRP
 Pirates of the Caribbean (2006) (based on the movie Pirates of the Caribbean)
 Dale Jr (600-unit limited edition, based on the NASCAR game with new Dale Earnhardt, Jr, #8 art package)
 Family Guy (2007; produced by PLD)
 Spider-Man (2007; produced by SRP, based on the Spider-Man films)
 Wheel of Fortune (2007) (based on the TV show Wheel of Fortune)
 Shrek (2008) (based on all three movies; produced by PLD; modified version of Family Guy)
 Indiana Jones (2008) (based on all four movies)
 Batman (2008) (based on the films Batman Begins and The Dark Knight)(Design by George Gomez)
 CSI: Crime Scene Investigation (2008; produced by PLD, based on the TV show CSI: Crime Scene Investigation)
 24 (2009; produced by SRP, based on the TV show 24)
 NBA (2009) Lonnie Ropp, Gary Stern (designers) Based on the older Sega pinball Space Jam
 The Lord of the Rings Limited Edition (Dec. 2009) gold mirrored backglass, shaker motor, gold package.
 Big Buck Hunter (2010) John Borg (designer)
 Iron Man (2010) John Borg (designer) Based on the film Iron Man
 Iron Man Classic (2010) (home edition)
 Avatar (2010) John Borg (designer), Based on James Cameron's AVATAR
 Rolling Stones (2011) Rolling Stones theme
 Tron: Legacy (2011) John Borg (designer), Based on Tron: Legacy
 Transformers (2011) George Gomez (designer)
 AC/DC (2012) Steve Ritchie (designer)
 X-Men (2012) John Borg (designer)
 Avengers (2012) (Design by George Gomez) 
 Transformers The Pin (2012) (intended for home use) (Design by George Gomez)
 Avengers The Pin (2013) (intended for home use) (Design by George Gomez)
 Metallica (2013) (designed by John Borg, art by Dirty Donny)
 Star Trek (2013) Steve Ritchie (designer) First Pro debut with all LED lighting as standard.
 Mustang (2014) John Trudeau (designer)
The Walking Dead (2014) (designed by John Borg)
 Wrestlemania (2015)
 Kiss (2015)
 Game of Thrones (2015) (designed by Steve Ritchie)
 Whoa Nellie! (2015)
 Spider-Man Home Edition (2016) (Design by George Gomez)
 Spider-Man Vault Edition (2016) (redesign of the existing Spider-Man with new playfield- and DMD-graphics, and new music and sound effects)
 Ghostbusters (2016) (based on the first two films)
 The Pabst Can Crusher (2016) (retheme of Whoa Nellie!)
 Batman '66 (2016) (based on the Batman television series from 1966)
 Aerosmith (2017)
 Star Wars (2017) (designed by Steve Ritchie)
 Guardians of the Galaxy (2017)
 Iron Maiden (2018) (first design of Keith Elwin)
 Supreme (2018) (retheme of Spider-Man Home Edition)(Design by George Gomez)
 Deadpool (2018) (based on the comics) (Design by George Gomez)
 The Beatles (2018) (Ka-Pow Pinball collaboration, with only 1,964 machines produced) (Design by George Gomez- evolution of Sea Witch by Mike Kubin.)
 Primus (2018) (retheme of Whoa Nellie!)
 The Munsters (2019) (based on 1960s TV series The Munsters)
 Black Knight: Sword of Rage (2019) (designed by Steve Ritchie as a sequel to Black Knight and Black Knight 2000, which he designed for Williams in the 1980s.)
 Star Wars Pin (2019) (intended for home use) (designed by George Gomez)
 Jurassic Park (2019) (designed by Keith Elwin)
 Elvira's House of Horrors (2019)
 Star Wars Comic Art (2019) (redesign of the existing Star Wars)
 Stranger Things (2019)
 Teenage Mutant Ninja Turtles (2020)
 Avengers: Infinity Quest (2020) (designed by Keith Elwin)
 Heavy Metal (2020) (Based on the popular magazine Heavy Metal)
 Led Zeppelin (2020) (designed by Steve Ritchie)
 The Mandalorian (2021) (Lead designer Brian Eddy)
 Godzilla  (2021) (lead designer Keith Elwin)
 Jurassic Park Pin (2021) (intended for home use)
 Rush  (2022) (based on the Canadian rock band Rush's music, designed by John Borg)
 James Bond 007 (2022) (designed by George Gomez)
 James Bond 60th Anniversary LE (2023) (designed by Keith Elwin)
 Foo Fighters (2023) (designed by Jack Danger)

Arcade games manufactured by Stern
 Astro Invader (1980) (programmed by Konami)
 Berzerk (1980)
 The End (1980) (programmed by Konami)
 Scramble (1981) (programmed by Konami)
 Super Cobra (1981) (programmed by Konami)
 Moon War (1981)
 Turtles (1981) (programmed by Konami)
 Strategy X (1981) (programmed by Konami)
 Jungler (1981) (programmed by Konami) 
 Armored Car (1981)
 Amidar (1981) (programmed by Konami)
 Frenzy (1982)
 Tazz-Mania (1982)
 Tutankham (1982) (programmed by Konami)
 Pooyan (1982) (programmed by Konami)
 Dark Planet (1982) (designed by Erick Erickson and Dan Langlois)
 Rescue (1982)
 Calipso (1982) (developed by Stern, released by Tago Electronics)
 Anteater (1982) (developed by Stern, released by Tago Electronics)
 Mazer Blazer (1982)
 Lost Tomb (1982)
 Bagman (Le Bagnard) (1982) (programmed by Valadon Automation)
 Pop Flamer (1982) (programmed by Jaleco)
 Star Jacker (1983) (programmed by Sega)
 Minefield (1983)
 Cliff Hanger (1983) (laserdisc game using video footage from TMS)
 Great Guns (1984)
 Goal to Go (1984) (laserdisc game)
 Super Bagman (1984) (programmed by Valadon Automation)

References

External links
 
 Stern Pinball, Inc. at the Arcade Museum website
 The GameRoom Blog: Cheap, Pretty and Fast: A Look at Classic Stern Pinballs

Companies based in Chicago
Companies based in Cook County, Illinois
Pinball manufacturers
Video game companies of the United States
Melrose Park, Illinois
Entertainment companies established in 1977
Video game companies established in 1977
Manufacturing companies established in 1977